The National Society of Film Critics (NSFC) is an American film critic organization. The organization is known for its highbrow tastes, and its annual awards are one of the most prestigious film critics awards in the United States. In January 2014, the NSFC had approximately 60 members who wrote for a variety of weekly and daily newspapers along with major publications and media outlets.

History
The society was founded in 1966 in the New York City apartment of the Saturday Review critic Hollis Alpert, one of several co-founding film critics who was refused membership to the New York Film Critics Circle because it preferred critics who worked for mainstream newspapers. His co-founders included Pauline Kael, a writer for The New Yorker, Joe Morgenstern, then a movie reviewer for Newsweek and Richard Schickel, a film critic for Life  magazine. The society was founded in order to counteract the influence of New York Times critic Bosley Crowther, who dominated the New York City film critics scene for many years. The original founding film critics, who were overwhelmingly based in New York, called their new group a "national" organization because they wrote for a number of magazines and newspapers with a national circulation.

Past distinguished members include Richard Corliss, the late Roger Ebert, David Edelstein, Stanley Kauffmann and Dave Kehr. and. Current members include David Ansen, Richard Brody, Justin Chang, Steve Erickson, Emanuel Levy, Gerald Peary, Jonathan Rosenbaum, David Sterritt, Peter Travers, Kenneth Turan and Stephanie Zacharek.

The organization is known for its highbrow tastes and its annual awards are one of the more prestigious film critics awards in the United States. In past years, many of its Best Picture winners have been foreign films and the choices rarely parallel the Academy Awards. It has agreed with the Oscar in nine instances since 1977: Annie Hall (1977), Unforgiven (1992), Schindler's List (1993), Million Dollar Baby (2004), The Hurt Locker (2009), Spotlight (2015), Moonlight (2016), Parasite (2019), and Nomadland (2020). Five other winners did receive the Oscar for Best Foreign Language Film: Z, The Discreet Charm of the Bourgeoisie, Day for Night, Get Out Your Handkerchiefs, and Amour.

The NSFC is also the American representative of the International Federation of Film Critics, which comprises the national organizations of professional film critics and film journalists from around the world.

Books
The society has published an ongoing series of anthologies of articles including:
The B List:The National Society of Film Critics on the Low-Budget Beauties,Genre-Bending Mavericks, and Cult Classics We Love, edited by David Sterritt and John C. Anderson, 2008 
The X List: A Guide to the Movies That Turn Us On, edited by Jami Bernard, Da Capo Press, 2005
The A List: 100 Essential Films, edited by Jay Carr, Da Capo Press, 2002
Flesh and Blood: On Sex, Violence, and Censorship, edited by Peter Keough, Mercury House, 1995
They Went Thataway: Redefining Film Genres, edited by Richard T. Jameson, Mercury House, 1994
Love and Hisses: Sound Off on the Hottest Movie Controversies, edited by Peter Rainer, Mercury House, 1992
Foreign Affairs: A Guide to Foreign Films, edited by Kathy Schulz Huffhines, Mercury House, 1991
Produced and Abandoned: The Best Films You've Never Seen, edited by Michael Sragow, Mercury House, 1990
The National Society of Film Critics on the Movie Star, edited by Elisabeth Weis, Penguin, 1981
The National Society of Film Critics on Movie Comedy, edited by Stuart Byron and Elisabeth Weis, Penguin, 1977

Annual film award categories
Best Film
Best Director
Best Actor
Best Actress
Best Supporting Actor
Best Supporting Actress
Best Screenplay
Best Cinematography
Best Foreign Language Film
Best Non-Fiction Film

References

External links

American film critics associations